Carina Jansson (born on 11 May 1966) is a Swedish sport shooter. She competed in rifle shooting events at the 1988 Summer Olympics.

Olympic results

References

1966 births
Living people
ISSF rifle shooters
Swedish female sport shooters
Shooters at the 1988 Summer Olympics
Olympic shooters of Sweden
People from Östhammar Municipality
Sportspeople from Uppsala County
20th-century Swedish women